Motidevi Shrestha (1913–1997) was a Nepalese politician.

She was born in 1913 in Lalitpur, Nepal. She was one of the founding members of the Communist Party of Nepal. Shrestha died in 1997.

In 2011, the Government of Nepal issued a stamp featuring Shrestha.

References 

1913 births
1997 deaths
20th-century Nepalese politicians
20th-century Nepalese women politicians
Communist Party of Nepal (original) politicians
Nepalese politicians
People from Lalitpur District, Nepal